Marco Miguel Gonçalves Ramos (born 26 April 1983) is a Portuguese former professional footballer who played as a left back.

Club career
Born in Levallois-Perret, Hauts-de-Seine of Portuguese descent, Ramos began playing football with AS Monaco FC, reaching the club's youth academy at the age of 15. During his two-year spell with the first team he saw very little playing time, being barred at the full-back positions by Patrice Evra and Hugo Ibarra; he was also loaned to US Créteil-Lusitanos in Ligue 2 for the 2004–05 season, being released by Monaco at its closure.

After another season in the second division, with LB Châteauroux, Ramos signed for RC Lens, where he would experience the most steady period of his career, being a starter in three of his five years and notably contributing with 35 games (33 starts) as the Sang et Or returned to Ligue 1 after winning the 2009 second level championship, being included in the Team of the Year.

Midway through 2010–11, Ramos joined S.C. Braga of Portugal on a two-year contract. During his stint with the Minho side, his output consisted of a match against F.C. Arouca for the campaign's domestic League Cup (70 minutes played, 4–0 away win).

On 27 July 2012, Ramos returned to his country of birth and joined division two club AJ Auxerre for two seasons.

International career
Ramos gained the first of his five caps for the Portugal under-19 team on 27 March 2002, in a 2–0 friendly win over Greece.

References

External links

National team data 

1983 births
Living people
People from Levallois-Perret
French people of Portuguese descent
Footballers from Hauts-de-Seine
French footballers
Portuguese footballers
Association football defenders
Ligue 1 players
Ligue 2 players
AS Monaco FC players
US Créteil-Lusitanos players
LB Châteauroux players
RC Lens players
AJ Auxerre players
S.C. Braga players
Portugal youth international footballers